Elio is an Italian masculine given name.

Elio may also refer to:

People
 Elio (singer), Italian singer
 Bernardo Elío y Elío (1867–1937), Spanish aristocrat and politician
 María Luisa Elío (1926–2009), Spanish writer and actress
 Francisco Javier de Elío (1767–1822), Spanish military officer

Other uses
 Elio Motors, an American startup automaker
 Elio, an upcoming 2024 animated film from Pixar and Disney

See also
 Hélio
 Helio (disambiguation)